Tereshchenko is a surname of Ukrainian origin. It originates from the name Teresh through an addition of the Ukrainian paternal suffix -enko.

People

Tereshchenko or Terestchenko family
Of a prominent Tereshchenko family of Ukrainian entrepreneurs and philanthropists. The following is an approximate family tree:

 Artemy Tereshchenko (1794–1873), a Ukrainian entrepreneur, land-owner, establisher of sugar factories 
 Mykola Tereshchenko (1819–1903) son of Artemii, a Ukrainian philanthropist, 
Varvara Khanenko (1848–1922, née Tereshchenko, art collector, a cofounder of the Kyiv Museum of Western and Oriental Art)
Ivan Tereshchenko (1854–1903), a painter, son of Nikola
 Mikhail Tereshchenko (1886–1956), a minister of Foreign Affairs of the Russian Provisional  Government, son of Ivan. Married [second wife]to Ebba Holst, 1 son, Ivan Mikhailovitch Tereshchenko .
 Ivan Mikhailovitch Tereshchenko  married Nadine Rousselot. 3 children, Michel (born in 1956) philosopher, Ivan (born in 1958) photographer, Alexandra (1964–1982)
 Theodore Artemievitch Tereshchenko - Fyodor pronunciation Russe de Theodore] brother of Nikola Married Nadjezda Hlopov in 1883 son of Artemii whose collection served a basis of the Kyiv Museum of Russian Art 3 children - Nadine - Theodore (Fyodor pronunciation en Russe de Theodore) - Nathalie
 Nadine Fyodorovna Tereshchenko   married to V. Mourravieff- Apostol 3 boys  - Vadim - Andrew  (Andy) - Alexis (Dick) Mourravieff- Apostol
 Theodore Fyodorovich Tereshchenko (1888-1950?), an aircraft constructor, son of Theodore Artemyevich married with Ekaterina  Beatrix Von keyserlingk issue a girl Nathalie Tereshchenko  married herself with Alexander Alexandrovitch, Prince, Schirinsky-Schikhmatoff issue 3 girls Kyra - Irina - Xénia.
 Nathalie Fyodorovna Tereshchenko married to Ouvarov issue 1 girl : Nathalie
 Simon Tereshchenko (1839-1893), son of Artemy

Others
 Alexei Tereshchenko (born 1980), a Russian ice hockey player
 Dmytro Tereshchenko (born 1987), a Ukrainian footballer
 Irina Tereshchenko (born 1947), a Soviet movie actress
 Nikolai Semyonovich Tereshchenko, chess composer
 Oles Tereshchenko (born 1975), a Ukrainian journalist
 Oleh Tereshchenko (born 1972), a Ukrainian football player
 Sergey Tereshchenko (1951–2023), a prime minister of Kazakhstan
Valery Tereshchenko (academic) (1901–1994), Russian−Soviet academic
Valery Tereshchenko (diplomat) (born 1952), a Russian diplomat and ambassador
 Vyacheslav Tereschenko (born 1977), a Ukrainian football player
 Vladislav Tereschenko (born 1977), a Ukrainian famous Engineer

Location
 Tereshchenkivska street in Kyiv, Ukraine named after Nikolay Tereshchenko

Others
 Tereschenko diamond -  Tereschenko blue diamond

References

See also
 

Ukrainian-language surnames